UFC 4: Revenge of the Warriors was a mixed martial arts (MMA) event held by the Ultimate Fighting Championship (UFC) on December 16, 1994, at the Expo Center Pavilion in Tulsa, Oklahoma, United States. The event was seen live on pay-per-view, and later released on home video.

Background
As usual, virtually all martial artists of any significance were contacted by the promoters of the event. The other way they recruited was what later became known as the "Royce's challenge letters." Even Mike Tyson was "challenged" by Royce Gracie while in jail.

History
UFC 4 used an eight-man tournament format, with the winner receiving $64,000. The event also featured three alternate fights. All seven tournament fights were shown on the live pay-per-view broadcast, as well as the Jason Fairn vs. Guy Mezger alternate fight. 

The tournament had no weight classes or weight limits. Each match had no time limit or rounds, therefore no judges were used for the night. The referee for the night was "Big" John McCarthy. Royce Gracie won the event by defeating Dan Severn with a triangle choke. The card also featured the notorious fight between Keith Hackney and Joe Son; Hackney won via submission after landing a series of unanswered strikes to the groin of Joe Son. 

Play-by-play announcer Bruce Beck and color commentator Jeff Blatnick were paired together for the first time on the pay-per-view and became the regular commentary team on UFC broadcasts up to and including UFC 15. They were joined by regular contributor Jim Brown.

Results

UFC 4 bracket

1Steve Jennum was forced to withdraw due to injury. He was replaced by Marcus Bossett.

See also
 List of UFC champions
 List of UFC events
 1994 in UFC

References

External links
UFC 4 results at Sherdog.com
UFC 4 fights reviews
Official UFC website
 MMA Mental History UFC 4

Ultimate Fighting Championship events
1994 in mixed martial arts
Mixed martial arts in Oklahoma
Sports in Tulsa, Oklahoma
1994 in sports in Oklahoma